Timaru Thistle is a soccer club in Timaru, New Zealand.

Competed
 1961 Chatham Cup
 1962 Chatham Cup
 1963 Chatham Cup

Association football clubs in New Zealand